Scott Robert Galloway (born 25 April 1995) is an Australian professional football (soccer) player who plays as a fullback for Melbourne City in the A-League.

Born in Perth, Galloway played youth football for the Australian Institute of Sport before making his professional debut for Melbourne Victory in 2013. He moved to Central Coast Mariners in 2016.

Galloway has made numerous appearances for Australia's under-20 and under-23 sides. He played in the 2013 FIFA U-20 World Cup.

Early life
Galloway's father, himself a football fan, grew up in Northern Ireland before moving to Australia, where Scott was born. His first club was Gosnells City in Perth, and he initially played in midfield before later moving into the defence. He was also a youth taekwondo champion.

Club career

Melbourne Victory
Galloway was one of three Melbourne Victory summer signings of 2013, along with Francesco Stella and Jesse Makarounas. He debuted in the Melbourne derby against crosstown rivals Melbourne Heart on 2 February 2013, a game in which they won 2-1, with goals from Archie Thompson and Mark Milligan. Galloway scored his first goal for the club in a loss to Wellington Phoenix on 2 March 2015.

Central Coast Mariners
On 19 October 2016, Galloway left Melbourne Victory after failing to secure regular game time at the club and joined Central Coast Mariners. He made his first appearance for the club as a substitute in a loss to Brisbane Roar three days later.

In May 2017, the Mariners allowed Galloway to travel to the Netherlands for a trial with Willem II. Three days later, the Mariners announced that Galloway would be leaving the club, although this was said not to be directly related to his Dutch trial.

Wellington Phoenix
Despite trialing in the Netherlands, on 29 June 2017, Galloway joined Wellington Phoenix on a one-year contract following Rado Vidošić and Darije Kalezić convincing him it would be the best place for him to develop his game.

Adelaide United
After being on trial for the club, Galloway officially signed for A-League side Adelaide United for the 2018–19 season. He scored his first goal for Adelaide in the first game of the 2018–19 A-League, a 1–1 draw with Sydney FC.

Career statistics

Notes

Honours
Melbourne Victory
 A-League Premiership: 2014–15

Adelaide United
 FFA Cup: 2018

Melbourne City
 A-League Premiership: 2020–21
 A-League Championship: 2020–21

References

External links
Scott Galloway profile  MelbourneVictory.com.au
 
 

Living people
1995 births
Association football defenders
Australian soccer players
A-League Men players
Melbourne Victory FC players
Central Coast Mariners FC players
Wellington Phoenix FC players
Adelaide United FC players
Melbourne City FC players
Australian people of Northern Ireland descent
Australia under-20 international soccer players
Soccer players from Perth, Western Australia